Four-Mations was a regular animation strand broadcast in the United Kingdom on Channel 4 in the 1990s. The series featured short animated films, tributes, and sometimes a documentary on animation. The series was notable for co-financing some films and broadcasting animated films from around the world. The series was first broadcast in 1990 and finished in 1998.

In 2008 a website made for people to upload, view and share animated films and games 4mations, borrowing the 4 Mation title.

Notable animations
Notable animations broadcast as part of 4 Mations:
 George Pal - Puppetoons
 Knick Knack in its uncut form
 Red's Dream
 Tin Toy
 Luxo Jr.
 Films by Candy Guard - Fatty Issues, Hair, Alternative Fringe etc.
 Nick Park - Creature Comforts
 Daddie's Little Piece of Dresden China
 Films by David Anderson such as Deadsy and The Door
 Ah Pook Is Here
 The Springer and the SS by Jiří Trnka
 Films by Dianne Jackson
 Paul Driessen - Tip Top, Elbowing, The Killing of an Egg, Sunny Side Up, On Land, at Sea and in the Air etc.
 Bob Godfrey - Do It Yourself Cartoon Kit, Henry 9 To 5, It's a square world, Alf, Bill and Fred
 Paul Klee - Taking a Line for a walk
 Bill Plympton - Push Comes to Shove
 Phil Mulloy - Cowboys
 Yellow Submarine
 The Blue Gum Boy (film) (Banned Fourmation)

References

External links
 BFi Film & TV Database listing for four mations

1990 British television series debuts
1998 British television series endings
1990s British animated television series
Channel 4 original programming
1990s in animation